Epimimastis is a genus of moths in the family Gelechiidae.

Species
 Epimimastis catopta Turner, 1919
 Epimimastis emblematica Meyrick, 1916
 Epimimastis escharitis Meyrick, 1916
 Epimimastis glaucodes Meyrick, 1910
 Epimimastis porphyroloma (Lower, 1897)
 Epimimastis tegminata Meyrick, 1916

References

 
Gelechiinae